Luther Cole may refer to:
 Luther A. Cole (1812–1880), American businessman and politician in Wisconsin
 Luther F. Cole (1925–2013), American lawyer, judge and politician in Louisiana